Cumberland Mall can refer to:

 Cumberland Mall (Georgia), located in the Cumberland district of Cobb County, Georgia (Metro Atlanta).
 Cumberland Mall (Maryland), located in downtown Cumberland, Maryland
 Cumberland Mall (New Jersey)